FixMeStick Technologies Inc founded in 2011, is a Canadian company headquartered in Montreal, Quebec. The company sells a computer virus-removal device, FixMeStick; and StartMeStick, a device that temporarily replaces a computer's operating system.

On January 15, 2014, the founders of the company (Corey Velan and Marty Alguire) appeared on CBC Television's Dragons' Den, a reality show in which entrepreneurs pitch their businesses to venture capitalists. They asked for a CAD$500,000 investment in exchange for a 20% share.

On November 26th, 2020, the founders of the company appeared again on Dragons' Den to pitch the StartMeStick. They asked for a CAD$1,000,000 investment in exchange for a 20% share.

Products 
The FixMeStick is an external computer virus-removal USB device. It was released for sale on May 9th, 2012. It is currently sold internationally both online and via various retailers. 
The StartMeStick is an external computer operating system on a USB device. It was released for sale in November 2019. It is currently sold internationally both online and via various retailers.

Reception
The FixMeStick has a four out of five star rating and has an editor's rating of "excellent" on PC Magazine.

References 

Linux-based devices
Companies based in Montreal
Computer-related introductions in 2012